"Bebe's Boobs Destroy Society" is the tenth episode of the sixth season of  South Park, originally aired on July 17, 2002. In the episode, Bebe Stevens's breasts begin to develop, and the boys are suddenly drawn to her even though they had no interest in her before. The episode focuses on and satirizes men's fascination over women's breasts.

Plot 
The children return to school for the first time since the death of Ms. Choksondik in the episode "Simpsons Already Did It", for the time being Mr. Mackey will teach them. During the break, Bebe (Wendy's best friend) has started to develop breasts. Though they are small (she at first thought they were mosquito bites), they prompt all the boys in town to begin to think that she is unusually smart and cool, without even understanding why. However, this causes Wendy and the other girls to get incredibly jealous, especially since Stan, Wendy's boyfriend (who hasn't asked Wendy to hang out with Stan and the other boys), is one of the boys affected. The girls begin making up malicious rumors about Bebe and accuse her of being sexually promiscuous.

Consequently, the boys begin to fight and bicker about who gets to play with Bebe, sound effects from Cannibal Holocaust play as the boys fight like the primitive men from 2001: A Space Odyssey and Planet of the Apes.

Throughout the episode Cartman plays a game he calls 'Lambs', which involves placing one of his dolls in a pit in his basement and torturing it, saying, "It puts the lotion on its skin, or else it gets the hose again.", as a reference to Silence of the Lambs.

Eventually, the boys get into a fight and seem to permanently turn into cavemen. Meanwhile, Bebe, worried that boys might never take her seriously (as happened to her mother, a stereotypical dumb blonde), consults a plastic surgeon about breast reduction surgery; however, he rejects the proposition because he considers breast reduction "insane" (which is made apparent especially after giving contrasting personalities to two female colleagues: one with large breasts, and the other flat-chested). He then tells her that if she wants them bigger, "now might be the time to size up"; Bebe leaves his office in frustration and disgust. Similarly when Wendy asks for a breast implant he accepts her request, but only after she announces she has three thousand dollars in cash, despite her mother's protest that she is too young. Meanwhile, Stan draws pictures of breasts on the wall of his house referring to his work and breasts as "Ah-tah," an apparent reference to the film Quest for Fire, wherein prehistoric man refers to fire as "Atar."  Stan's father, Randy, has a talk with him about his breast-obsession, going along with Stan's calling breasts "Ah-tahs", and describes all women have breasts: "And one day you'll meet a pair of boobs you want to marry." This eventually convinces Stan to snap out of his caveman-like trance.

After this scene, Bebe is shown in bed, with her breasts glowing and speaking to each other, plotting to rule the world by taking over the boys' minds. Bebe awakens and screams, her mother quickly runs into the room to ask her what is happening, she explains what she heard and her mother calmly replies that it is only natural for a growing woman to have boobs that plot to take over boys minds. This is where Bebe snaps, claiming she does not want boobs that are going to try to rule the world, and begins to come up with a plan to fix this problem.

The next time they are seen, at school, Bebe walks in wearing a box over her chest, which causes all the boys to suddenly break out of their trance; Stan shares his father's advice not to let breasts control their lives, and the boys all agree that it is for the best. Consequently, when Wendy shows up with her new breast implants, she is ridiculed rather than praised. Butters goes up and pokes them, saying that they are all "hard and oogy," to which Cartman replies "What a stupid bitch!" Wendy looks embarrassed.

Production
In the DVD commentary, Parker describes the inspiration for the show came from a party where two of his friends were drunk and trying to hit on a girl. One of the guys starts stroking the girls hair, when the other guy reached to stroke the girls hair too, the first guy started making guttural gorilla noises. Stone describes how South Park takes the view that society is the only thing that keeps people from descending into savages.

On syndicated broadcasts, the scene where Wendy is in surgery getting breast implants is cut.

The episode has been used to examine the treatment of female characters in South Park.

Home media
"Bebe's Boobs Destroy Society", along with the sixteen other episodes from South Park's sixth season, were released on a three-disc DVD set in the United States on October 11, 2005. The sets included brief audio commentaries by Parker and Stone for each episode. IGN gave the season a rating of 9/10.

References

External links

 "Bebe's Boobs Destroy Society" Full episode at South Park Studios
 

South Park (season 6) episodes